Philip Fonnereau (17 June 1739 – 17 February 1797) was a British merchant and banker, the eldest son of Zachary Philip Fonnereau.

He belonged to a wealthy Huguenot merchant family, and was a Director of the Bank of England. Fonnereau served as a Member of Parliament for the borough of Aldeburgh.

He had at least two daughters:
Mary Anne Fonnereau (d. 1844) married George Woodford Thellusson (d. 1811), on 3 April 1791.
Elizabeth Margaret Fonnereau married George Hibbert (1757-1837) on 30 August 1784.

References

George Hibbert
Thellusson pedigree

1739 births
1797 deaths
Members of the Parliament of Great Britain for English constituencies
British MPs 1761–1768